The 1974 NCAA Division I baseball season, play of college baseball in the United States organized by the National Collegiate Athletic Association (NCAA) began in the spring of 1974.  The season progressed through the regular season and concluded with the 1974 College World Series.  The College World Series, held for the twenty eighth time in 1974, consisted of one team from each of eight geographical districts and was held in Omaha, Nebraska at Johnny Rosenblatt Stadium as a double-elimination tournament.  Southern California claimed the championship for the fifth year in a row, the first team to claim five consecutive titles.

Realignment
Arkansas rejoined the Southwest Conference after nearly 50 years, having departed the conference in 1926.

Conference winners
This is a partial list of conference champions from the 1974 season.  Each of the eight geographical districts chose, by various methods, the team that would represent them in the NCAA Tournament.  15 teams earned automatic bids by winning their conference championship while 13 teams earned at-large selections.

Conference standings
The following is an incomplete list of conference standings:

College World Series

The 1974 season marked the twenty eighth NCAA Baseball Tournament, which culminated with the eight team College World Series.  The College World Series was held in Omaha, Nebraska.  The eight teams played a double-elimination format, with Southern California claiming their tenth championship, and fifth in a row, with a 7–3 win over Miami (FL) in the final.

Award winners

All-America team

References